Alan Jackson is an American country music artist. The first artist signed to Arista Nashville Records, he was with them from 1989 to 2011. He has released 18 studio albums, two Christmas albums, 10 compilation albums, and a tribute album for the label. His first two greatest hits albums (1995's The Greatest Hits Collection and 2003's Greatest Hits Volume II) as well as his 1992 studio album, A Lot About Livin' (And a Little 'bout Love), are all his highest-certified albums, each certified 6× Platinum by the Recording Industry Association of America, with sales in the United States of over 6,000,000.  He has sold over 40 million albums in the United States since 1991 when Nielsen SoundScan began tracking sales for Billboard.

In addition to releasing country albums, in 2006, he released Precious Memories, an album composed of Christian music as well as gospel music. The album was a commercial success, charting to number one on the Top Country Albums and the Top Christian Albums music charts. It is one of several Platinum-selling albums for Jackson.

Studio albums

1980s and 1990s

2000s

2010s

2020s

Christmas albums

Gospel albums

Compilation albums

Live albums

Video albums

Notes

References

Country music discographies
Discographies of American artists